David Greuner is a cardiovascular and thoracic surgeon based in New York City. Greuner focuses on minimally invasive surgery, and robotic surgery.  In October 2018, Greuner was sanctioned in court for failing to produce medical records and was cited for negligence by the judge for storing sensitive medical records in the residential garage of a friend.

Education
Greuner graduated from St. George's University School of Medicine. From 2002 until 2005, Greuner was a resident at Banner Good Samaritan Medical Center. He was a resident at Atlantic Health System from 2006 until 2009, and his fellowship was at Albert Einstein College of Medicine from 2009 until 2011. He was named chief resident of the year during his post graduate residency training at University of Arizona and Mount Sinai School of Medicine affiliate hospitals.

Career
Greuner works with the Holy Name Medical Center. He is the medical director of Centers for Special Surgery of Essex County. He is also managing director and co-founder of NYC Surgical Associates. Greuner and Dr. David Luu partnered with Adam Tonis of NYC Surgical to found NYClinic.

Work with telangiectasia and lipedema
The Dr. Oz Show featured Greuner in October 2013 to talk about telangiectasia and how to treat it. He also spoke about vein disease in the June 2016 edition of 25a Magazine. Greuner uses a liposuction like procedure which removes dysfunctional fat cells using only a small incision in the leg, and has started a national public awareness campaign on lipedema treatment. His expertise in treating lipedema received international attention. He has developed the No-Knife Endovenous Laser Ablation. His procedure does not use the plastic sheath that was used before which leaves scars. The process uses a laser that is focused through a skinny needle to seal problems in veins.

Work with Fibroid embolization and Pelvic congestion

David Greuner has been active in helping develop fibroid embolization, an approach involving a thin catheter threaded right to the blood vessels feeding the fibroids. This process eventually extracts enough blood from the fibroid that it shrinks it. Greuner's approach involves inserting the catheter through a small artery in the wrist. Greuner is also involved in developing treatments for Pelvic congestion syndrome, a condition in which varicose veins develop around the ovaries.

Lawsuits 
In October 2018, Greuner was sanctioned in court for failing to produce medical records for a former patient suing him for fraud, and was cited for negligence by the judge for storing sensitive medical records in the residential garage of a friend.

Recognitions
Greuner has been featured on the television shows, The Doctors, and Live From The Couch. The Doctors produced a calendar of "The Most Beautiful Doctors in America," in 2013, which was sold to benefit the American Red Cross Association.  In 2014, Greuner was featured on the Long Island Pulse list of top doctors.

References

American surgeons
Living people
1976 births